The leaping bonito (Cybiosarda elegans) is a species of saltwater finfish from the Scombridae (Mackerel) family. Scombridae includes such tribes as the mackerels, tunas, and bonitos – the latter of which, the Sardini tribe, this fish is a member.  It is the only member of the genus Cybiosarda, which is therefore called a monotypic taxon.  Since the bonitos and tunas are close relatives, this fish has variously been referred to by such other common names as Australian tuna, striped bonito, and Watson's bonito.

It is found in coastal and oceanic waters of northern Australia and southern New Guinea.

References

External links

Scombridae
Fish described in 1935